Torrey Westrom (born March 27, 1973) is a Minnesota politician and member of the Minnesota Senate. A Republican, he represents District 12, which includes all or parts of Big Stone, Douglas, Grant, Pope, Stearns, Stevens, Traverse and Wilkin Counties. He is the first known blind person to be elected to the Minnesota Legislature.

Political career
Westrom has served on several legislative commissions, including the Rural Health Care Advisory Task Force, the Secretary of State's voting equipment task force, and the Minnesota Legislative Audit Commission. In 2002, President George W. Bush appointed him to a four-year term on a federal advisory panel called the Ticket to Work. The panel advised Congress and the White House on return-to-work programs for people with disabilities.

Minnesota House of Representatives
Westrom is a former member of the Minnesota House of Representatives representing District 11A. He was first elected in 1996 and was reelected every two years until he ran for the Minnesota Senate. Before the 2002 legislative redistricting, he represented the old District 13A.

Minnesota Senate
Westrom was elected to the Minnesota Senate in 2012. As a senator, he has promoted affordable, reliable energy for Minnesota and supported investments in clean energy, such as research into "green ammonia" at the University of Minnesota-Morris and other carbon-free gas energy solutions.

Run for Congress
In December 2013, less than a year into his Senate term, Westrom announced that he would challenge incumbent Collin Peterson in Minnesota's 7th congressional district in 2014. He kicked off his campaign with events in Elbow Lake and Moorhead. He raised over $84,000 in the first month of his campaign. In the November general election, he won 46% of the vote, the highest Republican tally against Peterson since 1990.

Personal life
Westrom and his wife own TSI Real Estate, based in Elbow Lake, with properties in Hutchinson, Saint Paul, Madelia, and elsewhere.

References

External links 

 Senator Torrey Westrom official Minnesota Senate website
 Minnesota Public Radio Vote Tracker: Rep. Westrom
  Torrey Westrom official campaign website

Living people
1973 births
Blind politicians
Republican Party Minnesota state senators
William Mitchell College of Law alumni
Minnesota lawyers
People from Elbow Lake, Minnesota
People from Golden Valley, Minnesota
American evangelicals
American politicians with disabilities
American blind people
21st-century American politicians
20th-century American politicians
Candidates in the 2014 United States elections